Miranda Alexis Freeman (born March 23, 1995) is an American soccer player who plays as a defender for NJ/NY Gotham FC in the National Women's Soccer League.

Career
Freeman played for USC from 2013 to 2016, she was part of team that won the 2016 NCAA National Championship.

Sky Blue FC, 2017–present
Freeman was drafted by Sky Blue FC with the 10th overall pick in the 2017 NWSL College Draft. She appeared in 21 games in the 2017 season. Freeman returned to Sky Blue FC for the 2018 NWSL season, where she once again appeared in 21 games for the team.

Freeman tore the achilles tendon in her right ankle during preseason training ahead of the 2019 NWSL season, this injury would rule her out for the season.

Career statistics

College

Club

References

External links
 USC bio
 

1995 births
Living people
People from Palm Beach County, Florida
Soccer players from Florida
Sportspeople from the Miami metropolitan area
American women's soccer players
United States women's under-20 international soccer players
21st-century African-American sportspeople
21st-century African-American women
African-American women's soccer players
National Women's Soccer League players
NJ/NY Gotham FC draft picks
NJ/NY Gotham FC players
USC Trojans women's soccer players
Women's association football defenders